Alan Parsons  (born 20 December 1948) is an English audio engineer, songwriter, musician and record producer.

Parsons was the sound engineer on notable albums, including the Beatles' Abbey Road (1969) and Let It Be (1970), Pink Floyd's The Dark Side of the Moon (1973), and the eponymous debut album by Ambrosia in 1975. Parsons's own group, the Alan Parsons Project, as well as his subsequent solo recordings, have also been commercially successful. He has been nominated for 13 Grammy Awards, with his first win occurring in 2019 for Best Immersive Audio Album for Eye in the Sky (35th Anniversary Edition).

Music career 
In October 1967, at the age of 18, Parsons went to work as an assistant engineer at Abbey Road Studios. He was a tape operator during the Beatles' Get Back sessions, and he earned his first credit on the LP Abbey Road. He became a regular there, engineering such projects as Wings' Wild Life and Red Rose Speedway, five albums by the Hollies and Pink Floyd's The Dark Side of the Moon, for which he received his first Grammy Awards nomination.

"It was a bit of a frustration for me that I didn't get all the engineering credit," Parsons remarked of Dark Side of the Moon, "because Chris [Thomas] came in as mixing supervisor… I had been working on the album for a year and I obviously knew it inside-out by the mixing stage… There were times when I thought Chris was wrong, particularly about the use of limiting and compression on the mix, which I've never been a fan of… Although, later, I got the opportunity to mix the album the way I wanted when I did the quadraphonic version."

In his work with Al Stewart's "Year of the Cat," Parsons added the saxophone part and transformed the original folk concept into the jazz-influenced ballad that put Stewart onto the charts.

Parsons also produced three albums by Pilot, a Scottish pop rock band, whose hits included "January" and "Magic". He also mixed the debut album by the American band Ambrosia and produced their second album, Somewhere I've Never Travelled. Parsons was nominated for a Grammy Award for both albums.

In 1975, he declined Pink Floyd's invitation to work on Wish You Were Here – the follow-up to Dark Side – and instead initiated the Alan Parsons Project with producer, songwriter, and occasional singer Eric Woolfson, whom he had met at Abbey Road. The Project consisted of a revolving group of studio musicians and vocalists, most notably the members of Pilot and (on the first album) the members of Ambrosia. Unlike most rock groups, the Alan Parsons Project never performed live during its heyday, although it did release several music videos. Its only live performance during its original incarnation was in 1990. It released ten albums, the last in 1987. The Project terminated in 1990 after Parsons and Woolfson split, with the Project's intended 11th album released that year as a Woolfson solo album. Parsons continued to release work in his own name and in collaboration with other musicians. Parsons and his band regularly toured many parts of the world.

Although an accomplished vocalist, keyboardist, bassist, guitarist and flautist, Parsons only sang infrequent and incidental parts on his albums, such as the background vocals on "Time". While his keyboard playing was very audible on the Alan Parsons Project albums, very few recordings feature his flute. He briefly returned to run Abbey Road Studios in its entirety. Parsons also continued with his selective production work for other bands.

Of all his collaborators, guitarist Ian Bairnson worked with Parsons the longest, including Parsons' post-Project albums: Try Anything Once, On Air, The Time Machine and The Secret.

In 1998, Parsons became vice president of EMI Studios Group, including the Abbey Road Studios. He soon left the post, deciding to return to more creative endeavours. Parsons remained as a creative consultant and associate producer for the group.

As well as receiving gold and platinum awards from many nations, Parsons has received thirteen Grammy Award nominations. In 2006, he received a nomination for Best Surround Sound Album for A Valid Path. In 2019, he finally won his first Grammy Award for Best immersive Audio Album for his remastered 35th anniversary edition of Eye in the Sky.

Beginning in 2001 and extending for four years, Parsons led a Beatles tribute show called A Walk Down Abbey Road featuring performers such as Todd Rundgren, Ann Wilson of Heart, John Entwistle of the Who and Jack Bruce of Cream. The show structure included a first set where all musicians assembled to perform each other's hits, and a second set featuring all Beatles songs.

Since 1999, he has toured as the Alan Parsons Live Project (with Woolfson's permission). The band currently features lead singer P. J. Olsson, guitarist Jeff Kollman, drummer Danny Thompson, keyboardist Tom Brooks, bass guitarist Guy Erez, vocalist and saxophonist Todd Cooper, guitarist and vocalist Dan Tracey, along with Parsons on rhythm guitar, keyboards and vocals. This band performed live in Medellín, Colombia, in 2013 as Alan Parsons Symphonic Project in a performance recorded for Colombian television and also released on CD (live 2-CD) and DVD (May 2016).

In May 2005, Parsons appeared at the Canyon Club in Agoura Hills, California, to mix front-of-house sound for Southern California-based Pink Floyd tribute band Which One's Pink? and their performance of the Dark Side of the Moon in its entirety.

In 2010, Parsons released his single "All Our Yesterdays" through Authentik Artists. Parsons also launched a DVD educational series in 2010, titled the Art and Science of Sound Recording (ASSR) on music production and the complete audio recording process. The single "All Our Yesterdays" was written and recorded during the making of ASSR. The series, narrated by Billy Bob Thornton, gives detailed tutorials on virtually every aspect of the sound recording process.

During 2010, several media reports (one of which included a quote from a representative of Parsons), alleged that the song "Need You Now" by country music group Lady Antebellum used the melody and arrangement of "Eye in the Sky".

Parsons produced Jake Shimabukuro's album Grand Ukulele, which was released on 2 October 2012.  Also in 2012, he contributed lead vocals and performed keyboards and guitar on the track "Precious Life" by German electronic music duo Lichtmond, and appeared with many other noted progressive-rock musicians on the Prog Collective album by Billy Sherwood, singing lead on "the Technical Divide."

Parsons engineered the third solo album by Steven Wilson, The Raven that Refused to Sing (And Other Stories), released on 25 February 2013.

In late 2013, a live album recorded on tour in Germany and Austria with the title LiveSpan was released, accompanied by a single called "Fragile" with Simon Philips on drums.

Legacy Recordings, the catalogue division of Sony Music Entertainment, celebrated the 35th anniversary of Eye in the Sky, with the worldwide release of a definitive deluxe collector's box set, featuring rare and unreleased material, on 17 November 2017.

On 19 July 2018, Parsons and engineer Noah Bruskin opened a new recording studio, ParSonics. ParSonics was used in the recording of Alan Parsons’ most recent album The Secret.

On 26 April 2019, Parsons released a new studio album, The Secret, his first album in 15 years.

On 15 July 2022, Parsons released a new studio album, From the New World.

Family and personal life
His father was Denys Parsons, the grandson of the actor Sir Herbert Beerbohm Tree. Denys Parsons was a scientist, a film maker, and the press officer for the British Library, as well as a talented pianist and flautist. He developed the Parsons Code as a means of classifying musical melody and was the author of The Directory of Tunes and Musical Themes (1975, revised 2008).

Parsons resides in Santa Barbara, California. He has two sons from his first marriage. He is married to Lisa Griffiths; they have two daughters.

Discography

Full discography

Billboard Top 40 hit singles (US) 
1976 "(The System of) Doctor Tarr and Professor Fether"  37
1977 "I Wouldn't Want to Be Like You" No. 36
1979 "Damned If I Do" No. 27
1980 "Games People Play" No. 16
1981 "Time" No. 15
1982 "Eye in the Sky" No. 3
1984 "Don't Answer Me" No. 15
1984 "Prime Time" No. 34

Canadian singles 
1976 "(The System of) Doctor Tarr and Professor Fether"  62
1977 "I Wouldn't Want to Be Like You" No. 22
1980 "Damned If I Do" No. 16
1981 "Games People Play" No. 9
1981 "Time" No. 30
1982 "Eye in the Sky" No. 1
1983 "You Don't Believe" No. 43
1984 "Don't Answer Me" No. 20
1985 "Let's Talk About Me" No. 89

Honours and awards
Parsons was appointed Officer of the Order of the British Empire (OBE) in the 2021 Birthday Honours for services to music and music production.

Nominations
 1973 Pink Floyd The Dark Side of the Moon Grammy Nomination for Best Engineered Album, Non-Classical
 1975 Ambrosia Ambrosia Grammy Nomination for Best Engineered Album, Non-Classical
 1976 Ambrosia Somewhere I've Never Travelled Grammy Nomination for Best Engineered Album, Non-Classical
 1976 The Alan Parsons Project Tales of Mystery and Imagination Grammy Nomination for Best Engineered Album, Non-Classical
 1978 The Alan Parsons Project Pyramid Grammy Nomination for Best Engineered Album, Non-Classical
1978 Alan Parsons Producer of the Year, Grammy Nomination for Producer of the Year 
 1979 Ice Castles Original Motion Picture Soundtrack Grammy Nomination for Best Album of Original Score Written for a Motion Picture
 1979 The Alan Parsons Project Eve Grammy Nomination for Best Engineered Album, Non-Classical
 1981 The Alan Parsons Project The Turn of a Friendly Card Grammy Nomination for Best Engineered Album, Non-Classical
 1982 The Alan Parsons Project Eye in the Sky Grammy Nomination for Best Engineered Album, Non-Classical
 1986 The Alan Parsons Project "Where's The Walrus?" Grammy Nomination for Best Rock Instrumental Performance
 2007 Alan Parsons A Valid Path Grammy Nomination for Best Surround Sound Album
 2018 Alan Parsons, Dave Donnelly, &  PJ Olsson "Eye in the Sky 35th Anniversary Edition" Grammy Award for Best Immersive Audio Album Alan Parsons, surround mix engineer; surround mastering engineers; Alan Parsons, surround producer (The Alan Parsons Project)

References

External links

 
 
 Crawdaddy! "Parsons Knows: The Tale of Alan Parsons and Edgar Allan Poe"
Alan Parsons NAMM Oral History Program Interview (2011)

1948 births
Living people
British soft rock musicians
English audio engineers
English expatriates in the United States
English record producers
English rock musicians
Frontiers Records artists
Officers of the Order of the British Empire
Mercury Records artists
Musicians from London
People from Willesden
Progressive pop musicians
Progressive rock keyboardists
The Alan Parsons Project members